Non-autonomous mechanics describe non-relativistic mechanical systems subject to time-dependent transformations. In particular, this is the case of mechanical systems whose Lagrangians and Hamiltonians depend on the time.

This bundle is trivial, but its different trivializations  correspond to the choice of different non-relativistic reference frames. Such a reference frame also is represented by a connection
The corresponding covariant differential 
determines the relative velocity with respect to a reference frame .

Accordingly, the velocity phase space of non-autonomous mechanics is the jet manifold  of  provided with the coordinates . The dynamics of Hamiltonian non-autonomous mechanics is defined by a Hamiltonian form . 

See also
 Analytical mechanics
 Non-autonomous system (mathematics)
 Hamiltonian mechanics
 Symplectic manifold
 Covariant Hamiltonian field theory
 Free motion equation
 Relativistic system (mathematics)

References 
 De Leon, M., Rodrigues, P., Methods of Differential Geometry in Analytical Mechanics (North Holland, 1989).
 Echeverria Enriquez, A., Munoz Lecanda, M., Roman Roy, N., Geometrical setting of time-dependent regular systems. Alternative models, Rev. Math. Phys. 3 (1991) 301.
 Carinena, J., Fernandez-Nunez, J., Geometric theory of time-dependent singular Lagrangians, Fortschr. Phys., 41 (1993) 517.
 Mangiarotti, L., Sardanashvily, G., Gauge Mechanics (World Scientific, 1998) .
 Giachetta, G., Mangiarotti, L., Sardanashvily, G., Geometric Formulation of Classical and Quantum Mechanics (World Scientific, 2010) .

Theoretical physics
Classical mechanics
Hamiltonian mechanics
Symplectic geometry